The 2016 Texas Democratic presidential primary took place on March 1 in the U.S. state of Texas as one of the Democratic Party's primaries ahead of the 2016 presidential election.

On the same day, dubbed "Super Tuesday," Democratic primaries were held in ten other states plus American Samoa, while the Republican Party held primaries in eleven states, including their own Texas primary.

Decisive support from Latinos—particularly in the rural Rio Grande Valley—delivered a landslide win to Clinton.

Opinion polling

Results

Primary date: March 1, 2016
National delegates: 75

Results by county

Analysis
Clinton won the Texas primary by a landslide margin of over thirty points, thanks in large part to support from Hispanic/Latinos (whom she won by a margin of 71–29 over Bernie Sanders), African American  voters (whom she won 83–15) and white women (63-35 over Sanders). Clinton won all of the major cities (Fort Worth, Dallas, El Paso, San Antonio, and Houston, and Corpus Christi) except for Austin where Sanders won only narrowly.

Sanders won few counties outside of Travis County, where the University of Texas at Austin is located. He won neighboring Hays County, home to another prominent college, Texas State University in San Marcos. Sanders also managed to very narrowly edge out Clinton in Brazos County, home to College Station and Texas A&M University, by 28 votes. In all three counties mentioned above, Sanders performed worse than Barack Obama did in the 2008 Texas Democratic primary and caucuses, despite all three containing a bloc of young voters, a demographic Sanders usually performs well in.

The rest of Sanders's victories came from 11 sparsely populated counties where Republicans have performed strongly in the past several elections. His strongest performance came from the Texas Panhandle in Armstrong County, where he won 80% of the vote, 4 votes to Clinton's 1. Two counties in particular, Glasscock and Coke, had Sanders and Clinton tie.

References

Texas
Democratic primary
2016